George Stephen Comber (19 January 1890 – 6 March 1960), generally known as George Coomber, was an English professional footballer who made 168 Football League appearances playing as a half back for Brighton & Hove Albion.

Life and career
Coomber was born in West Hoathly, Sussex, and attended St Martin's School, Brighton, before beginning a glass-blowing apprenticeship in London. There he began his football career with Tottenham Thursday, Tufnell Park and Tottenham Hotspurthough not for their first teambefore returning home in 1913 to sign as an amateur for Brighton & Hove Albion, then of the Southern League. He appeared intermittently in 1913–14, turned professional at the end of the season, and soon established himself in the side. During the war, he served in the Army and made guest appearances for clubs including Tottenham Hotspur and Watford. He resumed his place in the Albion team and was a regular for the five years following the war, which included the club's first four seasons in the Football League. He captained the team from December 1922 until his career was ended by injury in 1924. Coomber used the proceeds of a benefit match to set up a construction company. He died in Hove in 1960 at the age of 70.

Notes

References

1890 births
1960 deaths
People from Mid Sussex District
English footballers
Association football wing halves
Association football defenders
Tufnell Park F.C. players
Tottenham Hotspur F.C. players
Brighton & Hove Albion F.C. players
Southern Football League players
English Football League players